John Neil Andrew  (born 7 June 1944) is a former Australian politician. He served in the House of Representatives for over 20 years from 1983 to 2004 representing the Division of Wakefield in South Australia for the Liberal Party. He became the 24th Speaker of the House of Representatives in 1998, a position he held until 2004.

Early life
Andrew was born in Waikerie, South Australia, and was a horticulturalist before entering politics. He was a councillor in the District Council of Waikerie from 1976 to 1983.

Politics
Andrew was elected to the House of Representatives in the 1983 federal election. Having served as Deputy Chairman of Committees, and Government Chief Whip, he became Speaker of the House after the October 1998 elections. He presided over the House during the special sitting in May 2001 to mark the centenary of the Parliament of Australia, which met in the Victorian Legislative Assembly after meeting in the Royal Exhibition Building, Melbourne, as did the first Parliament in 1901. In 2003, he "named" Greens Senators Bob Brown and Kerry Nettle after they interjected during George W. Bush's speech to Parliament.

In the international sphere, Andrew did much to raise Australia's reputation as being a country which punched well above its weight, and could be relied upon to keep its word, once given. He participated in bilateral meetings wherever possible. For example, he held bilateral meetings with the Finno-Ugric group at Inter-Parliamentary Union (IPU) meetings in Chile in 2003 to explain Australia's participation in the intervention in the Middle East.

One of Neil Andrew's most significant parliamentary contributions was made in the advancement of parliamentary administration and reform. As was acknowledged in the citation for his recognition in the Order of Australia. Together with the then President of the Senate, he authorised the review into parliamentary administration by the Parliamentary and Public Service Commissioner Andrew Podger. Subsequently, Andrew sponsored measures to reform the Parliament's administration, conducting sensitive private and public briefings, and providing moral support in the maneuvering of reform proposals through the Australian Senate. His efforts resulted in the success of reforms which had been advocated on at least a dozen occasions, without success over the previous 90 years, starting with Prime Minister Fisher in 1910.

Andrew previously represented a large swath of rural territory north of Adelaide. However, a redistribution ahead of the 2004 elections pushed his seat well to the south to take in heavily pro-Labor northern Adelaide suburbs that had previously been in the safe Labor seat of Bonython. Meanwhile, most of his former rural territory was redistributed to neighbouring Grey and Barker. Andrew held his old seat with a comfortably safe majority of 14 percent, but the reconfigured Wakefield had a Labor majority of just over one percent. Prior to the new boundaries being announced, Andrew notified Prime Minister John Howard that he would not renominate for Wakefield in the upcoming election. He remained Speaker until David Hawker was elected to succeed him on 16 November.

Honours
Andrew was appointed an Officer of the Order of Australia (AO) in the 2008 Australia Day Honours list "for service to the Parliament of Australia through the advancement of parliamentary administration and reform, and to the community in the areas of agricultural research, development and education" particularly as Chair of the Crawford Fund in Australia.

He was elected a Fellow of the Australian Academy of Technological Sciences and Engineering (FTSE) in 2006.

References

External links 
 Daily Hansard with dispute over above division
 

1944 births
Liberal Party of Australia members of the Parliament of Australia
Living people
Members of the Australian House of Representatives
Members of the Australian House of Representatives for Wakefield
Officers of the Order of Australia
Speakers of the Australian House of Representatives
Delegates to the Australian Constitutional Convention 1998
20th-century Australian politicians
21st-century Australian politicians
Fellows of the Australian Academy of Technological Sciences and Engineering